Antoine-Élisabeth-Cléophas Dareste de la Chavanne (28 October 18206 August 1882) was a French historian born in Paris, of an old Lyon family. His reputation rests on his authoritative major work, Histoire de France, published in nine volumes (1865–79).

Educated at the École des Chartes in Paris, he became professor in the faculty of letters at Grenoble in 1844, and in 1849 at Lyon, where he remained nearly thirty years. He died at Lucenay-lès-Aix (Nièvre département).

His works comprise: Histoire de l'administration en France depuis Philippe-Auguste (2 vols., 1848); Histoire des classes agricoles en France depuis Saint Louis jusqu'à Louis XVI (2 vols., 1853 and 1858), now quite obsolete; and a Histoire de France (8 vols., 1865-1873), completed by a Histoire de la Restauration (2 vols., 1879), a good summary of the work of Louis, baron de Viel-Castel, and by a Histoire du Gouvernement de Juillet, a dry enumeration of dates and facts. Before the publication of Lavisse's great work, Dareste's general history of France was the best of its kind; it surpassed in accuracy the work of Henri Martin, especially in the ancient periods, just as Martin's in its turn was an improvement upon that of Sismondi.

References

External links
 

1820 births
1882 deaths
French male non-fiction writers
19th-century French historians
19th-century French male writers
École Nationale des Chartes alumni